The Ottoman baths of Tyrnavos is a partially preserved Ottoman bath (hamam) at Tyrnavos, Thessaly, Greece, dating to the early 19th century.

The hamam is located outside the town proper, near the bridge of the Pineios River and the South-Eastern Europe Brigade camp. It survives only in part, consequently the precise arrangement of its rooms, or the position of the heating ovens, are unknown. Its construction is tentatively placed in the early 19th century. The surviving structure is a rectangle, with a main square hall flanked by two elongated halls and another, smaller square room. The square rooms are covered by domes, while the elongated ones by hull-shaped roofs.

The building was restored in the early 1990s, and converted to host cultural exhibitions and events. Despite occasional use for such events, today the site is closed to the public.

References

Buildings and structures in Larissa (regional unit)
Ottoman architecture in Thessaly
Tyrnavos
Tyrnavos
19th-century architecture in Greece